Alex Cuthbert (born 5 April 1990) is a Welsh rugby union player. Born in Gloucester, he plays on the wing for the Ospreys and the Wales national team.

Early life
Born in Gloucester, Cuthbert went to Newent Community School. He gained a diploma at Hartpury College before studying at Cardiff Metropolitan University.

Playing career
Cuthbert first played rugby during his years studying at Newent Community School playing club rugby for Hucclecote RFC and Westbury-on-Severn RFC. He later moved to Hartpury College where he was a member of Hartpury College R.F.C., coached by Allan Lewis in a team that included Jonny May on the opposite wing. He then moved to study at UWIC, where he played for both the college and Cardiff RFC.

Cuthbert came to wider attention in 2011 with the Cardiff Blues. As an attacking threat he underlined his credentials during the region's Heineken Cup campaign - scoring a brace as they secured a quarter-final berth with victory over Racing Metro.

International career

Wales
Although born and raised in England, Cuthbert qualifies for Wales as his mother was born in Wrexham.

He was noticed by Wales rugby sevens team coach Paul John. As a result, Cuthbert played for them in the 2009-2010 and the 2010-2011 IRB Sevens World Series, and in the 2010 Commonwealth Games.

Wales' senior management were also quick to take notice of Cuthbert's emergence, and he made his debut in the 12/11 international against Australia. There he replaced George North in the second-half, but it was the slot vacated by the retired Shane Williams that became his for the opening game of the 2012 Six Nations. At around 6'5, unusually tall for a winger, he represented a change of style from Williams' dancing feet and low centre of gravity, but his domestic form, pace and finishing prowess stacked up for Warren Gatland.

Cuthbert featured in the starting line-up in all five games of Wales' 2012 Six Nations Championship. He scored the opening try for Wales during their 27–13 victory over Scotland, then scored the second try of Wales' convincing 24–3 win over Italy in the penultimate round of the tournament. He was awarded man of the match for this performance. Cuthbert scored the only try in the final game of Wales' Six Nations campaign of 2012, against France, helping them to win the Grand Slam for the third time in eight seasons.

In the Autumn internationals of 2012 against Argentina, Samoa, New Zealand and Australia, Cuthbert was selected to play in each game. During the game against New Zealand, he scored the second Welsh try.

He scored two tries for Wales against England in the title decider of the 2013 Six Nations Championship.

British & Irish Lions
Cuthbert was selected for the 2013 British & Irish Lions tour to Australia, playing and scoring a try in the First Test, which the Lions won.

International tries

Wales

British & Irish Lions

Personal life

Cuthbert has discussed the impact of adverse social media at times in his career.

References

External links

 Profile at WRU.co.uk
 Profile at lionsrugby.com

1990 births
Living people
Alumni of Hartpury College
British & Irish Lions rugby union players from Wales
Cardiff Rugby players
Commonwealth Games rugby sevens players of Wales
English people of Welsh descent
English rugby union players
Rugby sevens players at the 2010 Commonwealth Games
Rugby union players from Gloucester
Rugby union wings
Wales international rugby union players
Exeter Chiefs players
Ospreys (rugby union) players